Sir Richard Phillips (13 December 1767 – 2 April 1840) was an English schoolteacher, author, publisher and vegetarianism activist.

Life
Phillips was born in London. Following some political difficulties in Leicester where he was a schoolteacher and bookseller (being imprisoned in 1792 for selling Thomas Paine's Rights of Man), he returned to London, established premises in Paternoster Row, St. Paul's Churchyard, and founded The Monthly Magazine in 1796; its editor was Dr. John Aikin, and among its early contributors were fellow radicals William Godwin and Thomas Holcroft. He built up a prominent fortune based on the speculative commission of newly revised textbooks and their publication, in a competitive market that had been freed by the House of Lords' decision in 1777 to strike down the perpetual copyright asserted by a small group of London booksellers to standard introductory works. His Juvenile Library published in 1800–03 provided the steady returns of all successful children's books. By 1807 he was in sufficient standing to serve as a Sheriff of London, at which time he was knighted on the occasion of presenting an address.

Another of the contributors to Phillips' Monthly Magazine was the Scottish novelist John Galt.  Angela Esterhammer has suggested that the character Masano, an irascible Italian printer in Galt's Andrew of Padua, the Improvisatore (1820), is based on Phillips.

Phillips overextended himself and was declared bankrupt in the Bank Panic.  He died in Brighton and is buried in the western extension of St Nicholas' Churchyard. He was a vegetarian.

Vegetarianism

Phillips was a vegetarian. He published Joseph Ritson's An Essay on Abstinence from Animal Food, as a Moral Duty in 1802. In the Medical Journal for July 27, 1811, Phillips listed sixteen reasons for adopting a vegetarian diet. His book Golden Rules of Social Philosophy (1814) contained the essay The Author's Reasons for not Eating Animal Food.

Works

He was the author, under his own name, of On the Powers and Duties of Juries, and on the Criminal Laws of England, 1811; A Morning's Walk from London to Kew, 1817; A Personal Tour Through the United Kingdom, 1828.

Many of his further works were published under at least five pseudonyms including David Blair. His own political leanings, evinced in Golden Rules of Social Philosophy, Or, A New System of Practical Ethics (1826) encouraged him to publish works by the radical jobbing writer of educational texts, Jeremiah Joyce, though often under pseudonymous disguises; Rees and Britten asserted in their Reminiscences of Literary London that many works were written by Phillips and attributed to well-known writers, who oversaw the proofs and put their names to the manuscripts, for remuneration. Joyce was the actual author of Gregory's Encyclopedia published by Phillips.

Sir Richard Phillips's Reasons for Not Eating Animal Food, Or Any Thing that Has Enjoyed Sensitive Life (1814)
Golden Rules of Social Philosophy, Or, A New System of Practical Ethics (1826)

References

External links
 
 

1767 births
1840 deaths
British vegetarianism activists
English writers
Knights Bachelor
Publishers (people) from London
Sheriffs of the City of London
Teachers of English